General Stirling may refer to:

Archibald Stirling (British Army officer) (1867–1931), British Army brigadier general
Sir Thomas Stirling, 5th Baronet (1733–1808), British Army general
William Stirling (British Army officer, born 1835) (1835–1906), British Army general
William Stirling (British Army officer, born 1907) (1907–1973), British Army general

See also
William Alexander, Lord Stirling (1726−1783), Continental Army major general